Live in Rome may refer to:

Albums
Live In Rome, album by The Tallis Scholars 2002 
Live in Rome, from Pink Floyd bootleg recordings
Live In Rome, jazz album by Sun Ra
Live In Rome, 1979 jazz album by Bill Evans